Jing-A Brewing Co.  is a microbrewery founded in 2012 in Beijing. The brewery is known for its use of Chinese ingredients such as red rice koji, ginger, and Sichuan peppercorn, and its interpretations of traditional beer styles such as IPA, witbier, and stout. Since 2014, the company has operated a taproom in Sanlitun, a popular nightlife area for both foreigners and locals.

History
The brewery began as a homebrewing project between Alex Acker and Kristian Li, two North American expatriates who had been living in Beijing since 2000. The two brewed increasingly large batches of homebrew for their friends while entertaining the thought of eventually turning their hobby into a business. In these early years, they also developed a reputation for using their beer to hold pop-up parties, such as the election-watching party in 2012 for which they made a beer based on Barack Obama's White House Honey Brown Ale.

After various moves to scale up their brewing in restaurant kitchens and on borrowed equipment, in early 2013, Acker and Li invested in building the first small professional-grade brewery for Jing-A, with a monthly production of 5000L, inside a bistro in Beijing's embassy district.

Beer List

Core Beers

Seasonal Beers

Collaboration Beers

See also
 Beer in China
 Chaoyang District, Beijing
 List of microbreweries

References

External links
 Official Site

Beer in China
Food and drink companies based in Beijing
Manufacturing companies based in Beijing
Breweries in China